H.A.V.E. Online is a massively multiplayer online game (MMO) third-person shooter cartoon-style video game. It is developed by Korean developer SK imedia. There were several versions of these games. The first version was hosted in Taiwan, followed by a Thai version. NQ Games (previously known as SK iMedia), with Rock Hippo Productions announcing that they would publish the game for North America and Europe under the name "MicroVolts". MicroVolts shutdown permanently on 9. September 2017. There are currently no running versions of the game.

Hosting 

There has been no word on a Korean publisher for this game until Gravity Corp announced that it will publish the game in Korea. The company has also announced a Japanese version, although no release date has been set.

Chinese video game company, Insrea, hosted the game in Taiwan. The closed beta phase was launched November 26. 2009.

Thai video game company, TOT published the game in Thailand. The service is no longer running and was shut down in 2018.

Rock Hippo Productions announced that it will publish the game in Europe and North America under the name, "MicroVolts".

References

External links 
Official Taiwanese Site
Official Europe/North America Site:English Version or Germany (Deutsch) Version
Official Korean Website & Public Test Server (PTS) (English Version – Closed in 2017)
Official Thai Site – Running until 01 November 2018
Official Japanese Site
Official Indonesia Site 3
Official Latin American Site
Official Brazilian Site

2009 video games
Video games developed in South Korea
Gamebryo games
Multiplayer online games
Third-person shooters
Windows games
Windows-only games